Big Deal or The Big Deal may refer to:

Music
 Big Deal (band), a rock pop band
 Big Deal, a 1988 album by Killer Dwarfs
 Big Deal (Black Drawing Chalks album), a 2007 album by Brazilian band Black Drawing Chalks
 "Big Deal" (LeAnn Rimes song), a 1999 song by LeAnn Rimes
 "Big Deal", a song on the Hoodoo Gurus' 2000 album Ampology
 "Big Deal", a song by Seaway from the 2013 album Colour Blind

Film and television
 The Big Deal (2021 TV series), a 2021 Irish reality television series
 The Big Deal, a 1953 American television play written by Paddy Chayefsky
 The Big Deal (film), a 1961 Australian television play
 Big Deal (game show), a 1996 American TV show
 Big Deal (TV series), a 1984–1986 British comedy drama
 Big Deal, a 2021 two-part documentary TV series directed by Craig Reucassel 
 The Big Deal (TV channel), now Sony Movies, a UK digital TV channel

Other
 Big deal (subscription model) in the publishing industry
 Big Deal (musical), a 1986 Broadway musical
 Big Deal: A Year as a Professional Poker Player, a 1992 book by Anthony Holden